The 2012 Kerry Senior Football Championship was the 112th staging of the Kerry Senior Football Championship since its establishment by the Kerry County Board in 1889. The championship ran from 16 June to 28 October 2012.

Dr. Crokes entered the championship as the defending champions in search of a third successive title.

The final was played on 28 October 2012 at FitzGerald Stadium in Killarney, between Dr. Crokes and Dingle in what was their first ever meeting in the final. Dr. Crokes won the match by 2–13 to 0–8 to claim their ninth championship title overall and a third title in succession.

Colm Cooper was the championship's top scorer with 5-21.

Team changes

To Championship

Promoted from the Kerry Intermediate Football Championship
 Milltown/Castlemaine

From Championship

Relegated to the Kerry Intermediate Football Championship
 Ardfert

Results

Round 1

Round 2

Round 3 

 Feale Rangers received a bye in this round.

Quarter-finals

Semi-finals

Final

Championship statistics

Top scorers

Overall

In a single game

Miscellaneous

 Dr. Crokes became the first team since South Kerry between 2004–06 to win three titles in-a-row.
 Dingle qualified for the final for the first time since 1948.

References

Kerry Senior Football Championship
Kerry Senior Football Championship
Kerry SFC